The 2012 Cuyahoga County Council election was held on November 6, 2012, to elect members in even-numbered districts to four-year terms.

No seats changed hands in this election, and only District 2 was contested. Democrats defended all four of their seats up for election, maintaining their majority in the chamber.

District 2

Democratic primary

Primary results

Republican primary

Primary results

General election

Results

District 4

Democratic primary

Primary results

General election

Results

District 6

Republican primary

Primary results

General election

Results

District 8

Democratic primary

Primary results

General election

Results

District 10

Democratic primary

Primary results

General election

Results

References

Cuyahoga County Council
Cuyahoga County Council
2012 Council
Cuyahoga County Council